Events in the year 1780 in Portugal.

Incumbents
Monarch: Mary I

Events

16 January – Battle of Cape St. Vincent, a naval battle off the southern coast of Portugal during the Anglo-Spanish War. A British fleet defeated a Spanish squadron.

Births
10 May – José Homem Correia Teles, judge and politician (d. 1849).

20 May – José Bernardino de Portugal e Castro, marquis (d. 1840)
12 July – Mouzinho da Silveira, statesman, jurist and politician (d. 1849)

Deaths

18 January – Gaspar of Braganza, Archbishop of Braga (b. 1714)
23 October – João da Bemposta (b. 1726)

Full date missing 

Abade António da Costa, composer (b. 1714)
Miguel António do Amaral, court painter (b. 1710)

References

 
1780s in Portugal
Portugal
Years of the 18th century in Portugal
Portugal